Gennadij Germanovich Sagalchik is a Soviet-born American chess grandmaster and coach.

Chess career
Sagalchik is a former Belarus Junior Champion, and was awarded the Grandmaster title in 1994. In 2008, he tied for second place with Sergei Tiviakov at the IV Torneo Internacional Abierto de Ajedrez in Alajuela, Costa Rica.

Sagalchik has been a chess coach in Long Island since the 2010s. In 2015, four of his students played in the World Youth Chess Championship.

Personal life
Sagalchik lives in Brooklyn with his wife Olga, who is a Woman FIDE  master. They have two daughters and a son.

References

Living people
1969 births
American chess players
Chess grandmasters
Soviet emigrants to the United States
21st-century Belarusian people
Sportspeople from Brooklyn